Patrick James Light (born March 29, 1991) is an American former professional baseball pitcher. He played in Major League Baseball (MLB) for the Boston Red Sox and Minnesota Twins. In early 2023, Mr. Light attempted to move on from his baseball past, and adopted the moniker, “Business Pat”, which mainly includes posting inspirational tweets and drinking. Although, now he is starting to  return to his previous lifestyle as Baseball Pat.

Amateur career
While pitching at high school, Light posted a 20–0 record with a 1.52 earned run average for the Christian Brothers Academy in New Jersey, en route to set the best season pitching record in Shore Conference history.

The Minnesota Twins selected Light in the 28th round of the 2009 draft, but he went on to college instead. Attending Monmouth University, he went 14–14 with a 3.84 ERA and 196 strikeouts in 39 appearances from 2010 to 2012, ranking No. 53 on Baseball America's preseason Top 100 list of 2012 draft prospects. In the summer of 2010, Light was an NECBL All-Star, pitching for the Newport Gulls. In 2011, he played collegiate summer baseball with the Chatham Anglers of the Cape Cod Baseball League.

Professional career

Boston Red Sox
The Boston Red Sox selected Light in the first round (37th overall) of the 2012 MLB draft. Light made his professional debut in 2012 with the Short-Season A Lowell Spinners, where he posted a 0–2 record with a 2.37 ERA in 12 starts, allowing eight runs (seven earned) on 27 hits and five walks, while striking out 30 in  innings of work. He then joined the Low A Greenville Drive in 2013, but suffered a partial tear in his right hamstring that was initially misdiagnosed before all-but-ending his season in early June. He returned in late August for a rehab assignment with the GCL Red Sox, where he pitched six innings of shutout ball in three appearances. Being limited to  innings at Greenville, he went 1–4 with 28 strikeouts and an ERA of 8.06.

Light returned to Greenville in 2014 and earned a promotion to the High-A Salem Red Sox during the midseason. He went 8–6 with a 4.83 ERA in 25 starts between Greenville and Salem, striking out 76 batters while walking 37 in  innings.

After making 49 starts over his first three seasons, Light was told he would be changing roles and throwing out of the bullpen when he reported to Double-A Portland Sea Dogs to open the 2015 season. With the Red Sox relief pitchers finishing last in fastball average velocity in 2014, and giving another hard-throwing prospect Matt Barnes a chance as a reliever, the organization decided to increase velocity out of the bullpen more than it had before.

Light delivered a solid start to his 2015 season after being moved to the bullpen. He regularly reached 94–96 mph with his heavy fastball, reportedly touched 100 mph at times, and reintroduced a splitter, which he had used successfully before being drafted in 2012. As a result, Light went 1–1 with a 2.43 ERA and three saves in 21 games at Double-A Portland, allowing 11 walks and striking out 32 in  innings, while holding opponents to a .168 batting average. He then earned a promotion to the Triple-A Pawtucket Red Sox in the month of June. Light was 3–5 with five saves and a 3.88 ERA in the two stints, totaling  innings pitched to go with 67 strikeouts and 37 walks.

Light opened 2016 at Pawtucket. He was promoted to the Boston Red Sox on April 24. After giving up six runs, including two home runs, in a July 2 game against the Los Angeles Angels of Anaheim, he was demoted back to Pawtucket.

Minnesota Twins
On August 1, 2016, the Red Sox traded Light to the Minnesota Twins for Fernando Abad. Light was designated for assignment by the Twins on February 6, 2017.

Pittsburgh Pirates
On February 9, 2017, Light was traded to the Pittsburgh Pirates for cash considerations or a player to be named later. The Pirates designated Light for assignment on June 10, 2017.

Seattle Mariners
On June 17, 2017, Light was claimed off waivers by the Seattle Mariners. He was released on April 19, 2018.

Player profile
He also had an  slider, with a  changeup as a work-in-progress. He was projected as a reliever, with potential as a setup man or closer.

References

External links

1991 births
Living people
Baseball players from New Jersey
Boston Red Sox players
Chatham Anglers players
Christian Brothers Academy (New Jersey) alumni
Criollos de Caguas players
Greenville Drive players
Gulf Coast Red Sox players
Indianapolis Indians players
Liga de Béisbol Profesional Roberto Clemente pitchers
Lowell Spinners players
Major League Baseball pitchers
Minnesota Twins players
Monmouth University alumni
Monmouth Hawks baseball players
Pawtucket Red Sox players
People from Colts Neck Township, New Jersey
Portland Sea Dogs players
Rochester Red Wings players
Salem Red Sox players
Sportspeople from Monmouth County, New Jersey
Tacoma Rainiers players